At least two ships of the Swedish Navy have been named HSwMS Orion,

 , a torpedo boat 
 , a signals intelligence gathering vessel launched in 1984

See also

Swedish Navy ship names